Brian Becker is an American politician who was a Democratic member of the Connecticut House of Representatives, where he represented the 19th Assembly District, which consists of portions of West Hartford, Avon, and Farmington.

A graduate of Hall High School in West Hartford, Becker attended the University of Pennsylvania, where he received a bachelor's degree in economics and history. He then went on to attend Boston University School of Law, where he earned his J.D.

Becker first ran for the Connecticut House of Representatives in 2010, when then-Representative Beth Bye declined to seek reelection and instead ran for the Connecticut State Senate. Becker defeated West Hartford Board of Education member Terry Schmitt in the August 10 Democratic primary, and went on to defeat West Hartford Town Councilor Denise Berard Hall in the general election. Becker has since been reelected in 2012 and 2014. In 2016, Becker announced his retirement from the legislature.

Electoral history

References

Year of birth missing (living people)
Living people
Place of birth missing (living people)
Jewish American state legislators in Connecticut
Democratic Party members of the Connecticut House of Representatives
People from West Hartford, Connecticut
University of Pennsylvania School of Arts and Sciences alumni
Boston University School of Law alumni
Connecticut lawyers
21st-century American politicians
21st-century American Jews